Omalo Ethnographic Museum is an ethnographic museum in village Zemo (Upper) Omalo in Tusheti region, Georgia. 
Tushetian Ethnographic Museum of Keselo, in Omalo  preserves traditional items used by the Tusheti people, such as agricultural tools, household items and weapons. Museum exhibition is dedicated to traditions and customs and reflects the way Tushetians used to live in the past.
Exhibition also includes archeological finding, such as Bronze Age axes and jewelry.
Tourist trail also includes Keselo fortress.

See also 
 Tushetians
 Keselo
 Tusheti National Park

References 

Museums in Georgia (country)
Ethnographic museums in Asia
Buildings and structures in Kakheti